Christos Louis, nicknamed Kitsos, is a Greek Molecular Geneticist. He graduated from the Medical School of the University of Marburg in 1974 and joined the team of Prof. C.E. Sekeris, first at Marburg and then at the German Cancer Research Center Heidelberg, obtaining his doctoral degree in Cell biology from Heidelberg University in 1977.  His work focuses  on Genomics and Bioinformatics of insects and vector-borne/tropical diseases.

He performed postdoctoral research as an EMBO fellow with Walter J. Gehring at the Biozentrum University of Basel (1978-1979) and Paul Schedl at the Department of Biology at Princeton University (1980-1983). Fotis Kafatos invited him to join the staff of the IMBB of the, then, Research Centre of Crete in 1983; he subsequently became a member of the Faculty of the Department of Biology at the University of Crete where he was promoted to Full Professor in 1989. During his tenure he was the Chairman of his Department for a total of 11 years. Later, he was a founding member of the University of Crete's Programme on Bioethics. He retired from the University in 2014 although, as an emeritus, he kept his appointment as Research Staff at the IMBB, now an Institute of the Foundation for Research & Technology – Hellas.

From December 2012 till April 2015 he was also the acting Head of Bioinformatics at the Centre for Functional Genomics at the Dept. of Experimental Medicine of the University of Perugia. He has served on a number of national (Greek) and international committees and boards, and he is a member of EMBO. He was a member of several standing and ad hoc committees of the World Health Organization/TDR, including its Scientific and Technical Advisory Committee (STAC). Kitsos Louis has been a member of the editorial boards of several scientific journals and has co-authored more than 170 scientific publications.

His research interests include: 
 Insect Molecular Genetics  with emphasis on Genomics; genome sequencing and post-genomic expression analysis. He was a member of the European Drosophila Genome Project and the Anopheles Genome Project.
 Study of the molecular interactions between Anopheles and the Malaria parasite.
 Development of biomedical ontologies, especially for medical entomology, and databases. With his colleagues in Crete, he developed AnoDB/AnoBase, the first genetic databases for Anopheles, which later evolved into VectorBase.
 Epidemiology and biology of vector-borne diseases.

In his youth, Kitsos Louis was a competition swimmer for Panathinaikos A.O. having won several Greek national championships.

References 

1948 births
Living people
Greek geneticists
Scientists from Athens
University of Marburg alumni
Academic staff of the University of Perugia